The Dhaka Derby is a football rivalry between the Dhaka teams of Abahani and Mohammedan, although the rivalry was bigger in the past, it is still considered to be the biggest game in the country's domestic football scene.

Mohammedan was founded in 1936, and Abahani was founded in 1972.Bangladesh football's popularity grew based on this two Dhaka clubs – Mohammedan and Abahani. These are the two clubs that have divided the country's fans into two camps over the course of a fierce rivalry of 47-odd years. These two clubs met several times in a year in competitions like the Federation Cup, Bangladesh Premier League, Independence Cup.

History

1970s–1990s
 
The two sides first met in 1973 in Dhaka League.On that match Abahani player Amalesh Sen  scored the first goal in the history of Dhaka derby.Salahuddin scored the second goal for Abahani and the Abahani won that match by 2–0 and caused an upset over the mighty Black and Whites.

In 1978, Bangladesh participated in Asian Games for the first time. Monwar Hossain Nannu, being the senior most player in the squad, was originally nominated as the captain for the Bangkok event. But, then the Federation changed their decision and goalkeeper Shahidur Rahman Shantoo from MSC was appointed the new captain. 7 Abahani players including Nannu withdrew from the team in protest.
The much depleted Bangladesh team struggled in the tournament losing 1–0 to Malaysia and 3–0 to India. Following this incident, the federation generally tried to pick national team captain outside the big two Dhaka teams for the next few years. 

The 1980s was the golden era of club football in Dhaka. Any match involving Mohammedan or Abahani would draw huge crowd at the Dhaka stadium. The rivalry between the two rivals was at its peak in this era.
Abahani won a hat-trick of titles in 1983, 1984 & 1985 and Mohammedan made a record of winning an unbeaten hat-trick of titles in 1986, 1987 & 1988-89. The rivalry reached its peak as fans always wanted their favorite team to win and they also contested in foreign tournaments and were the best sides.

2000s–2010
Since the start of the Bangladesh Premier League in 2007, the rivalry has lost majority of its past fame.

Colours

Statistics

'''Major Honours (National)

This following table includes only those titles recognised and organised by the BFF and AFC.

References

External links

Mohammedan SC (Dhaka)
Abahani Limited Dhaka
Association football rivalries
Football in Bangladesh
Sport in Dhaka